Rafael Ángel Jorge Julián Barrett y Álvarez de Toledo (1876–1910) was a Spanish writer, narrator, essayist and journalist, and a major figure in 20th century Paraguayan literature.

Bibliography 
Rafael Barrett, "The Woman in Love" (english version of "La Enamorada")
Rafael Barrett, A partir de ahora el combate será libre. Recopilación de artículos prologados por Santiago Alba Rico, Madrid, Ladinamo Libros, 
Rafael Barrett "La Rebelión", Asunción del Paraguay, 15 de marzo de 1909
Texto extraído por Philía de ANARKOS Literaturas libertarias de América del Sur. 1900; Compiladores: Jean Andreu, Maurice Fraysse, Eva Golluscio de Montoya; Ediciones CORREGIDOR, Buenos Aires, 1990.
Francisco Corral "Vida y pensamiento de Rafael Barrett", Universidad Complutense, Madrid 2000. 
Francisco Corral El pensamiento cautivo de Rafael Barrett. Crisis de fin de siglo, juventud del 98 y anarquismo. Editorial Siglo XXI. Madrid 1994. 
Gregorio Moran "Asombro y búsqueda de Rafael Barrett", Anagrama, Barcelona 2007. 
Catriel  "Rafael Barrett, una leyenda anarquista", Capital , Buenos Aires 2007. Con prólogo de Abelardo Castillo.
Asombro y búsqueda de Rafael Barrett, por Francisco Corral – ABC Digital
¿Descubrir a Barrett?, por Guillermo Rendueles
Rafael Barrett, un anarquista brillante, falseado, algunos artículos de opinión

External links 
"My Anarchism" by Rafael Barrett
RafaelBarrett.net, obras de Rafael Barrett
Barrett, estudio, biografía, bibliografía y textos selectos de Barrett
Rafael Barrett y la condición humana, estudio del pensamiento de Barrett por Francisco Corral
Obra
Evocación de Rafael Barrett Álvarez de Toledo
A partir de ahora el combate será libre, recopilación de artículos de Rafael Barrett prologados por Santiago Alba Rico
 El pensamiento de Rafael Barrett: un "joven del 98" en el Río de la Plata, by Francisco Corral
Rafael Barrett, textos de y sobre
 

1876 births
1910 deaths
People from Torrelavega
Paraguayan non-fiction writers
Paraguayan male writers
Paraguayan anarchists
Male non-fiction writers
Spanish anarchists